Álvaro García may refer to:

 Alvaro García (sport shooter) (1894–1983), Mexican Olympic shooter
 Álvaro García Rodríguez (born 1961), Uruguayan economist and politician
 Álvaro García Linera (born 1962), Bolivian politician
 Álvaro García (footballer, born 1986), Spanish footballer
 Álvaro García (footballer, born 1984), Uruguayan footballer for Tacuary
 Álvaro García (footballer, born 1992), Spanish footballer
 Álvaro García (footballer, born 2000), Spanish footballer